Limacus maculatus, the green cellar slug or Irish yellow slug, is a species of slug native to the Caucasus and Black Sea coast. It has also been introduced to a number of northern European countries. In its introduced range the species is often synanthropic. It is most likely to be confused with Limacus flavus, which it closely resembles externally.

Limax ecarinatus Boettger, 1881 is the appropriate name if Limacus is considered a subgenus of Limax. The reason is that Nunneley already described a Limax maculatus in 1837; this turned out to be a synonym of Limax maximus, but nevertheless the combination Limax maculatus cannot be re-applied to a species described under the name maculatus at a later date (even though that 1851 description used a different genus, Krynickillus).

Distribution 
This species is believed to be native in parts of Romania, Bulgaria, Ukraine, Turkey, southwestern Russia, Armenia, Azerbaijan, and Georgia. It has now spread to:  
 Great Britain
 Ireland
 Greece
 Canary Islands
 Germany
 Netherlands
 Czech Republic
 Belarus
 Kyiv in Ukraine
 Saint Petersburg and Astrakhan in Russia

References

External links 
 Limax ecarinatus at Animalbase
 images

Limacidae
Gastropods described in 1851